The 2017 Pure Michigan 400, was a Monster Energy NASCAR Cup Series race held on August 13, 2017 at Michigan International Speedway in Brooklyn, Michigan. Contested over 202 laps extended from 200 laps due to an overtime finish, on the  D-shaped oval, it was the 23rd race of the 2017 Monster Energy NASCAR Cup Series season.

Report

Background

The track is used primarily for NASCAR events. It is sometimes known as a "sister track" to Texas World Speedway, and was used as the basis of Auto Club Speedway. The track is owned by International Speedway Corporation (ISC). Michigan International Speedway is recognized as one of motorsports' premier facilities because of its wide racing surface and high banking (by open-wheel standards; the 18-degree banking is modest by stock car standards).

Entry list

First practice

Qualifying

Qualifying results

Practice (post-qualifying)

Second practice

Final practice

Race

A red flag happened late in the race with one lap to go, the race restarted in overtime with two laps to go, Kyle Larson scored his fourth career victory and third win in a row at Michigan.

Race results

Stage results

Stage 1
Laps: 60

Stage 2
Laps: 60

Final stage results

Stage 3
Laps: 82

Race statistics
 Lead changes: 7 among different drivers
 Cautions/Laps: 5 for 28
 Red flags: 1 for 5 minutes and 39 seconds
 Time of race: 2 hours, 40 minutes and 38 seconds
 Average speed:

Media

Television
NBC Sports covered the race on the television side. Leigh Diffey, Jeff Burton and Steve Letarte had the call in the booth for the race Diffey subbed for Rick Allen, who was covering the IAAF World Championships in London. Dave Burns, Marty Snider and Kelli Stavast reported from pit lane during the race.

Radio
Motor Racing Network had the radio call for the race, which was simulcast on Sirius XM NASCAR Radio.

Standings after the race

Drivers' Championship standings

Manufacturers' Championship standings

Note: Only the first 16 positions are included for the driver standings.
. – Driver has clinched a position in the Monster Energy NASCAR Cup Series playoffs.

References

Pure Michigan 400
Pure Michigan 400
Pure Michigan 400
NASCAR races at Michigan International Speedway